Beaudéan is a commune in the Hautes-Pyrénées department in the Occitanie region of south-western France.

The inhabitants of the commune are known as Beaudéannais or Beaudéannaises.

Geography

Beaudean is located at the mouth of the Lesponne valley and the Campan valley in the inter-communal cooperative of Haute-Bigorre some 20 km south by south-east of Tarbes and 5 km south of Bagnères-de-Bigorre. Access to the commune is by the D935 road from Pouzac in the north which passes through the eastern tip of the commune and the village and continues south-east to Campan. The D29 branches off the D935 in the commune and goes along the length of the commune south-west to end in Chiroulet. Apart from the village there is the hamlet of Serris. The commune is mixed forest and farmland in the north and rugged forested mountains in the south.

The Adour river forms the north-eastern border of the commune as it flows north-west eventually joining the Atlantic ocean at Boucau. The Adour de Lesponne flows from the south-west of the commune, forming much of the western border as it flows north-east, gathering tributaries such as the Ruisseau du Brouilh (which forms the southern border of the commune), the Ruisseau de Narbios, the Hourquet, and the Ruisseau de Hount Hérède, to join the Adour at the eastern corner of the commune. The Serris river flows north-east through the commune and the village to  join the Adour. The Ruisseau de Binaros forms most of the eastern border of the commune as it flows north to join the Adour de Lesponne in the narrow "neck" of the commune.

Toponymy

Historical  names:

In Beldeyano, Latin (c. 1090, Larcher, Cartulary of Saint-Pé).
Arnaldus de Beudean, Latin and Gascon (1283, Procès Bigorre).
Beudeaa, (1285, Montre Bigorre).
apud Beudeanum, Latin (1300, Enquête Bigorre).
De Baudeano, Latin (1313 Debita regi Navarre; 1342, Pouillé of Tarbes).
de Veudeano, Latin (1379 Procuration of Tarbes).
Beudean (1429, Censier of Bigorre).
Baudean, (1760, Larcher, Pouillé of Tarbes).

Beaudéan appears as Beaudean on the 1750 Cassini Map and the same on the 1790 version.

Beaudéan comes from the name of a domain. The Germanic personal name Bald-win (Latinised as Baldinus)  with the suffix -anum.

Heraldry

Administration

List of Successive Mayors

Judicial and administrative proceedings
Beaudéan falls within the area of the Tribunal d'instance (District court) of Tarbes, the Tribunal de grande instance (High Court) of Tarbes, the Cour d'appel  Court of Appeal of Pau, the Tribunal pour enfants (Juvenile court) of Tarbes, the Conseil de prud'hommes (Labour Court) of Tarbes, the Tribunal de commerce (Commercial Court) of Tarbes, the Tribunal administratif (Administrative tribunal) of Pau, and the Cour administrative d'appel (Administrative Court of Appeal) of Bordeaux

Demography
In 2017 the commune had 395 inhabitants.

Culture and heritage

Civil heritage
A Museum  in the house where Dominique Jean Larrey, was born traces the history of military surgery.

Religious heritage
The Church of Saint Martin (15th century) is registered as an historical monument. is It is characterized by a bell tower with four corbelled turrets. The Church contains several items that are registered as historical objects:
A Hilarri (18th century)
A Retable and Tabernacle (18th century)
2 Candlesticks (18th century)
The Choir enclosure (18th century)

Notable people linked to the commune
 Dominique Jean Larrey (1766-1842),  a French surgeon in Napoleon's army, was born in the village.

See also
Communes of the Hautes-Pyrénées department

References

Communes of Hautes-Pyrénées